Raymond Charles Ellis (January 26, 1911 – November 15, 1989), nicknamed "Rocky", was an American Negro league pitcher between 1934 and 1940.

A native of Darby, Pennsylvania, Ellis played seven seasons with the Philadelphia Stars between 1934 and 1940. He also played for the Homestead Grays in his final season of 1940. Ellis died in Richmond, Virginia in 1989 at age 78.

References

External links
 and Seamheads

1911 births
1989 deaths
Homestead Grays players
Philadelphia Stars players
Baseball pitchers
Baseball players from Pennsylvania
People from Darby, Pennsylvania
20th-century African-American sportspeople